Marie Thusgaard Olsen (born 21 May 1993) is a Danish sailor. She competed in the 49er FX event at the 2020 Summer Olympics.

References

External links
 
 

1993 births
Living people
Danish female sailors (sport)
Olympic sailors of Denmark
Sailors at the 2020 Summer Olympics – 49er FX
Place of birth missing (living people)